Niue maintains diplomatic relations with various other countries and multilateral organizations.

Niue is an island country in the Pacific Ocean in a state of free association with New Zealand. The King in right of New Zealand is the head of state of Niue - as such Niue is part of the Realm of New Zealand.

The Repertory of Practice of United Nations Organs records that in 1988 "New Zealand stated ... that its future participation in international agreements would no longer extend to ... Niue". Niue was granted membership of UNESCO in 1993 and the World Health Organization in 1994. Also in 1994, the United Nations Secretariat "recognized the full treaty-making capacity ... of Niue".

New Zealand retains a constitutional link with Niue in relation to citizenship, with people from Niue being citizens of New Zealand.

Niue conducts bilateral relations with other countries and interacts with the international community as an independent state.

Despite self-rule, New Zealand manages its defence and foreign affairs on Niue's request. Like the Cook Islands, however, Niue has begun to establish formal diplomatic relations with sovereign states.  with Niue. China's ambassador to New Zealand, Zhang Limin, is accredited to Niue, and became the first Chinese ambassador to present his credentials there in October 2008.

Diplomatic relations 

The following countries have established formal diplomatic relations with Niue.

Oceania

  (27 February 2013)
  (2013)
  (November 2015 or before)
  (9 January 2004 or before)
  (2 August 1993)
  (1994 or 9 December 2014)
  (June 2014 or before)
  (11 July 2022)

Europe

  (23 January 2001)
  (15 January 2012 or before)
 (12 September  2015)
 (23 June 2015)
  (7 June 2014)

Asia

  (12 December 2007); see China–Niue relations
  (30 August 2012); see India–Niue relations
  (13 July 2019)
  (24 May 2011 or before)
  (4 August 2015)
  (30 January 1996)
  (27 September 2022)
  (6 August 2012)
  (27 August 2013)

Americas

 (2 September 2016)
 (6 July 2021)
 (5 September 2014)
 (3 July 2020)
 In 2022, Joe Biden signaled an intention to recognize the Cook Islands and Niue as sovereign states as part of a larger strategy for foreign policy in the Pacific.

International organization participation

 ACP, AOSIS, ESCAP (associate), FAO, IFAD, OPCW, Pacific Islands Forum, Sparteca, SPC, UNESCO, WHO, WMO
 Commonwealth of Nations - Niue is a part of the Commonwealth, but is not a member state, being a dependency of New Zealand, whose Commonwealth membership covers Niue, Cook Islands, and Tokelau, as well as New Zealand itself.
 In November 2011, Niue was one of the eight founding members of Polynesian Leaders Group, a regional grouping intended to cooperate on a variety of issues including culture and language, education, responses to climate change, and trade and investment.

Participation in international treaties and conventions

 Biodiversity Convention and its Cartagena Protocol, Cotonou Agreement, POPs Project, UNCCD, UNCLOS, UNFCCC and its Kyoto protocol

See also 

 List of diplomatic missions of Niue
 List of diplomatic missions in Niue
 Foreign relations of the Cook Islands
 Foreign relations of New Zealand
 Politics of Niue

Notes

References

External links 

 Government of Niue
 Niue Diplomatic and Consular Corps 2005
 Niue Abstracts Part 1 A (General Information)
 Niue representatives overseas historical list

 
Niue and the Commonwealth of Nations